Viktoriya Konstantinova Tomova (born 25 February 1995) is a professional Bulgarian tennis player. Tomova reached a career-high WTA singles ranking of world No. 87 achieved on 27 February 2023. Her best doubles ranking is world No. 254, achieved on 11 August 2014.
She is currently the No. 1 Bulgarian in singles. 

She also plays for the Bulgaria Fed Cup team with a current win–loss record of 12–11.

Professional career

2016: WTA debut and top 150
In July 2016, Tomova reached the biggest final of her career so far at the Hungarian Ladies Open, losing to fellow Bulgarian Elitsa Kostova. The following week, she failed to qualify for the Bucharest Open, losing in the final qualifying round to Nadia Podoroska. 

Tomova made her debut at US Open reaching qualifying competition. She finished the year as No. 152 in the world.

2017: WTA 250 tour-level debut, top 150 year end
Tomova started the season with a loss to Elitsa Kostova at the qualifying draw of the Brisbane International, and then she lost in the first round of qualifying draw in Sydney. At her debut at Australian Open, she lost in the qualifying competition to Eri Hozumi. At her Wimbledon debut, she fell in the first round of the qualifying competition. 
In July, she scored her biggest win so far, defeating Julia Görges in the first round of the Swedish Open. At the US Open she lost at the qualifying competition. In October, she managed to qualify for the Linz Open, where she lost to previous year's finalist Viktorija Golubic in three sets.

She finished the year ranked No. 141 in the world.

2018: Grand Slam debut at the Australian Open and first win at Wimbledon 
Tomova made her debut in the main draw of a Grand Slam tournament, coming through qualifying rounds at the Australian Open as a lucky loser, but then lost in straight sets to Nicole Gibbs. 

At the French Open, she was eliminated in the second round of qualifying.

She made her main draw debut at Wimbledon, going through qualifying and defeating Tereza Smitková for her first Grand Slam match win but then lost to Serena Williams in the second round, in straight sets.

2019–20: US Open and WTA 500 debut
Tomova made her WTA 500 main draw debut by reaching the second round with a win over Alizé Cornet at the 2019 Pan Pacific Open but was defeated by top seed and eventual champion, Naomi Osaka.

In 2020, she made her main draw debut at the US Open as a direct entry where she was defeated by 22nd-seeded Amanda Anisimova, in the first round.

Prior to that, Tomova tested positive for COVID-19 while staying in Palermo, Italy, for a prospective tournament. Despite the short season, she finished 2020 at No. 138, a new best year-end result.

2021: WTA 1000 debut, first WTA Tour semifinal
In March, she made her debut at the WTA 1000-level Dubai Tennis Championships entering the main draw as a lucky loser. She lost in the first round to tenth seed Elise Mertens.

In April, Tomova reached for the first time in her career the semifinals of a WTA 250 tournament at the Copa Colsanitas with a three-set victory over Nuria Párrizas Díaz. As a result, she reached a new career-high of world No. 122 in the singles rankings, on 10 May 2021. 

At the Serbia Open, she advanced to the semifinals as a lucky loser, winning two matches in the same day after two days of postponement due to rain. She lost her semifinal to the eventual champion, fourth seeded Paula Badosa. As a result of this run, Tomova rose 15 spots to No. 108. On 28 June, she reached a new new career-best ranking of No. 104.

In August, Tomova entered the main draw of her first Grand Slam tournament for the season, coming through qualifying rounds at the US Open as a lucky loser where she lost to Lauren Davis. At the WTA 125 Open de Valencia she reached again the semifinals for the first time at this level. 
She finished the year ranked 116 in singles, a new best year-end season ranking.

2022: French Open debut, first WTA 500 quarterfinal & 125 final, top 100
Tomova qualified for the Australian Open to make her second main draw at this major but lost to eventual first-time quarterfinalist Alizé Cornet. On 28 February 2022, she reached a career-high ranking of world No. 103. Defeating Astra Sharma in qualifying, she made her main-draw debut at the Indian Wells Open.

Also at the French Open, she made her debut as a lucky loser, thus completing the set of main-draw appearances in all four Grand Slam championships. However, she lost to world No. 9, Danielle Collins, in the first round.
At the Open de Valencia, she reached again quarterfinals for a second consecutive year defeating Sara Errani and world No. 69 and second seed, Varvara Gracheva, en route, before losing in three tight sets to eventual finalist Wang Xiyu.

At the WTA 500 Eastbourne International, she replaced as a lucky loser second seed Ons Jabeur. After getting a bye into the second round, she defeated world No. 37, Shelby Rogers, and then advanced to her first WTA 500 quarterfinal after defeating Kirsten Flipkens and taking revenge for the loss in the final round of qualifying.
At Wimbledon, she reached the second round for the second time defeating wildcard Daria Gavrilova before losing to world No. 5, Maria Sakkari. At the same tournament, she made her debut in a doubles event at a Major, partnering Elisabetta Cocciaretto; they reached the second round.

At the Swedish Open, she reached again the quarterfinals defeating İpek Öz. She went one step further defeating former top-20 player Mihaela Buzarnescu in the semifinal. There, she lost to eventual champion Jang Su-jeong. As a result, she reached a new career-high singles ranking of 101, on 11 July 2022.
Following a semifinal showing at the Polish Open in Grodzisk Mazowiecki, she reached world No. 99 on 8 August 2022 making her the only female representative of Bulgaria in the top 100.

Tomova lost in the last round qualifying for the US Open to Slovak Viktória Kužmová.
At the Budapest Open, she reached the final of a WTA 125 tournament for the first time defeating two top-100 players, third seed Jasmine Paolini and Julia Grabher, and also two former top-50 players, Anna Karolína Schmiedlová and Océane Dodin. She was defeated in the final by Tamara Korpatsch.

She finished the year ranked No. 90 in the world, a new best year-end ranking, on 7 November 2022. Two weeks later, on 23 November 2022, she was confirmed as a participant at the 2023 United Cup as part of the Bulgarian team.

2023: United Cup debut, First WTA 1000 win
She participated in the 2023 United Cup as the No. 1 Bulgarian female player. She played one singles match, where she lost to world No. 6 Maria Sakkari. At the  Australian Open she lost in the first round to 12th seed Belinda Bencic.

She qualified for the main draw at the Linz Open defeating Barbara Haas and former Rolland Garros finalist, wildcard Anastasia Pavlyuchenkova. She lost in the first round to another former Rolland Garros finalist Marketa Vondrousova.

Next she qualified again this time for the main draw of the WTA 500 in Doha defeating three players in the top 100, Maryna Zanevska and two Americans Lauren Davis and Madison Brengle. She lost to seventh seed Belinda Bencic in the first round.

The following week, she reached again the main draw after qualifying at the WTA 1000 2023 Dubai Tennis Championships defeating Ankita Raina and Jang Su-jeong. She defeated Kaia Kanepi to record her first WTA 1000 win. As a result she moved to a new career high ranking of No. 87 on 27 February 2023.

Performance timeline

Only main-draw results in WTA Tour, Grand Slam tournaments, Fed Cup/Billie Jean King Cup and Olympic Games are included in win–loss records.

Singles
Current after the 2023 Dubai Open.

Doubles

WTA 125k Challenger finals

Singles: 1 (runner-up)

ITF Circuit finals

Singles: 24 (16 titles, 8 runner–ups)

Doubles: 20 (12 titles, 8 runner–ups)

National participation

Fed Cup/Billie Jean King Cup
Viktoriya Tomova debuted in Bulgaria Fed Cup team in 2014; since then she has accumulated a 7–8 singles record and a 5–3 doubles record (12–11 overall).

Singles (7–8)

Doubles (5–3)

United Cup

Singles (0–1)

Notes

References

External links

 
 
 

1995 births
Living people
Sportspeople from Sofia
Bulgarian female tennis players